Chandler David Moore (born March 21, 1995) is an American singer, songwriter, and worship leader. Moore currently partners Maverick City Music, a collective of worshippers working in the contemporary Christian music and Gospel world.

Maverick City Music released two projects in 2019 followed by an additional 11 projects. Moore's collaborations include "Man of Your Word" with KJ Scriven and "Voice of God" with Dante Bowe and Steffany Gretzinger. On the collaborative album Old Church Basement with Elevation Worship, Moore sang "Jireh" alongside Naomi Raine and "Wait on You" with Bowe. Each song debuted as a chart topper. Moore continues to collaborate with mega and pop artists, including Justin Bieber and Tori Kelly.

Natively from Charleston, South Carolina, Moore grew up going to church where his father was a pastor. Later in life, when Moore was a music director at a small church in his hometown, he says he experienced a personal encounter with God, which inspired a passion for studying Scripture. Moore then became a background vocalist for Travis Greene and Tye Tribbett and penned songs for Bri Babineaux and Tribbett. Additionally, Moore has begun actively pursuing a solo career, and released several singles leading up to his first solo album, Feelings, which released in 2020.

Moore currently resides in Dallas, Texas, with his wife and family.

Early life 
Chandler David Moore was born on March 21, 1995, to  Bishop Brian David Moore and Elder Jametta Chandler Moore in Charleston, South Carolina.

Career 
Chandler Moore released his debut single, "Never Runs Out", on June 20, 2014, independently. On December 26, 2014, Moore released his second single, "Our Hope". On June 23, 2017, Moore featured alongside Bri Babineaux on her single "What You Don't Realize". On March 23, 2018, Moore released the single "What a Friend".

On July 3, 2020, Moore featured All Nations Music's "Bless Your Name", which was released to Gospel radio as the lead single to their debut album Come Alive (2020). "Bless Your Name" peaked at No. 25 on the Hot Gospel Songs chart. Maverick City Music released "Man of Your Word" which featured Moore alongside KJ Scriven, to Christian radio as the lead single from their debut album, on August 21, 2020. "Man of Your Word" peaked at No. 18 on the Hot Christian Songs chart. On September 30, 2020, Moore featured on Dante Bowe's single, "Voice of God", alongside Steffany Gretzinger. "Voice of God" peaked at No. 36 on the Hot Christian Songs chart. On October 30, 2020, Moore was featured on Nathaniel Bassey's single, "Olorun Agbaye - You Are Mighty", alongside Oba. On November 13, 2020, Moore released his debut visual album, Feelings. Feelings debuted at number four on Billboard's Top Gospel Albums chart.

On February 5, 2021, Moore and Essential Worship released their version of Hillsong Worship's hit song "King of Kings" as a single. On March 26, 2021, Elevation Worship and Maverick City Music released "Jireh", which Moore featured on with Naomi Raine, as the first promotional single from their collaborative live album, Old Church Basement. "Jireh" concurrently debuted at No. 10 on the US Hot Christian Songs chart and at No. 1 on the Hot Gospel Songs chart, thus becoming Moore's first appearance in the top ten for both charts, and his first Hot Gospel Songs chart-topper. Moore alongside Dante Bowe featured on "Wait on You" by Elevation Worship and Maverick City Music, which was released as the third promotional single from Old Church Basement (2021), on April 23, 2021. "Wait on You" debuted at No. 9 on the US Hot Christian Songs chart and at No. 1 on the Hot Gospel Songs chart.

Chandler Moore was nominated for two GMA Dove Awards at the 2021 GMA Dove Awards, being nominated for Gospel Worship Recorded Song of the Year for "Voice of God" by Dante Bowe alongside Steffany Gretzinger, and Worship Recorded Song of the Year for "Jireh" by Elevation Worship and Maverick City Music alongside Naomi Raine. Moore also received four Grammy Award nominations in the lead-up to the 2022 Grammy Awards: two nominations in the Best Gospel Performance/Song category for featuring on "Voice of God" and a songwriting nomination for "Wait on You" by Elevation Worship and Maverick City Music; two Best Contemporary Christian Music Performance/Song for "Man of Your Word" alongside KJ Scriven and for featuring on "Jireh".

Personal life 
On June 19, 2017, Moore's son, named Chandler D. Moore II (affectionately called Deuce), was born. Moore posts photos with his son on his social media platforms. According to People magazine, Moore also has a son named River.

On January 17, 2021, Moore's apartment was badly damaged in a fire while he was attending a church service.

Moore became engaged to Hannah Poole in March 2021. Moore and Poole got married on June 8, 2021, during a wedding ceremony held at The 4 Eleven in Fort Worth, Texas.

Discography

Studio albums

Singles

As lead artist

As featured artist

Promotional singles

As featured artist

Other charted songs

Other appearances

Awards and nominations

GMA Dove Awards 

!
|-
| 2020
| "Only You Can Satisfy (Live)"
| Gospel Worship Recorded Song of the Year
| 
| 
|-
| rowspan="2" | 2021
| "Voice of God" 
| Gospel Worship Recorded Song of the Year
| 
| rowspan="2" | 
|-
| "Jireh" 
| Worship Recorded Song of the Year
| 
|-
| rowspan="5" | 2022
| rowspan="2" | "Jireh" 
| Song of the Year
| 
| rowspan="5" | 
|-
| Worship Recorded Song of the Year
| 
|-
| Jubilee: Juneteenth Edition 
| Contemporary Gospel Album of the Year
| 
|-
| "Breathe" 
| Gospel Worship Recorded Song of the Year
| 
|-
| Lion 
| Worship Album of the Year
| 
|-
|}

Grammy Awards 

!
|-
| rowspan="6" | 2022
| "Voice of God" 
| rowspan="2" | Best Gospel Performance/Song
| 
| rowspan="6" | 
|-
| "Wait on You"
| 
|-
| "Man of Your Word" 
| rowspan="2" | Best Contemporary Christian Music Performance/Song
| 
|-
| "Jireh" 
| 
|-
| Jubilee: Juneteenth Edition
| Best Gospel Album
| 
|-
| Old Church Basement
| Best Contemporary Christian Music Album
| 
|-
| rowspan="5" | 2023
| "Kingdom"
| Best Gospel Performance/Song
| 
| rowspan="5" | 
|-
| Kingdom Book One
| Best Gospel Album
| 
|-
| "God Really Loves Us (Radio Version)"
| rowspan="2" | Best Contemporary Christian Music Performance/Song
| 
|-
| "Fear Is Not My Future"
| 
|-
| Breathe
| Best Contemporary Christian Music Album
| 
|-
|}

Notes

References

External links 
 

1995 births
Living people
African-American male singer-songwriters
African-American Christians
Christians from South Carolina
American Charismatics
American performers of Christian music
American gospel singers
Composers of Christian music
People from Charleston, South Carolina
21st-century African-American male singers
Singer-songwriters from South Carolina
Grammy Award winners